Amphiplica concentrica is a species of sea snail, a marine gastropod mollusc in the family Caymanabyssiidae.

Description

Distribution
This species occurs in the Atlantic Ocean off the Azores.

References

External links

Caymanabyssiidae
Gastropods described in 1909